Saltsman may refer to:

People

Adam Saltsman, American video game designer
Chip Saltsman (born in 1968), American politician from Tennessee
Don Saltsman (1933–2014), American politique from Illinois
Bruce Saltsman (1930–2017), American civil servant from Tennessee
Max Saltsman (1921–1985), Canadian businessman and politician

See also
Zaltzman (surname)
Saltman (surname)